During the 1994–95 season, Red Star Belgrade participated in the 1994–95 First League of FR Yugoslavia and 1994–95 FR Yugoslavia Cup.

Season summary
Red Star won their sixth double in this season.

On 12 November 1994, Red Star played a friendly match against Olympiacos.

Red Star were awarded a special trophy to commemorate their win in the 100th Eternal derby.

Squad

Results

First League of FR Yugoslavia

FR Yugoslavia Cup

See also
 List of Red Star Belgrade seasons

References

Red Star Belgrade seasons
Red Star
Serbian football championship-winning seasons